Parallelograms is an album by American psychedelic folk singer Linda Perhacs. It was produced by Leonard Rosenman. Her first and only album until the release of The Soul of All Natural Things in 2014, it was all but completely ignored when originally released on Kapp Records in 1970. Discouraged by the lack of commercial attention and the label's reluctance to promote the album, Perhacs returned to her career as a dental hygienist. In the 30 or so years that followed, the album gradually developed a cult following.

Reissues
Folk label the Wild Places, which first reissued the album from a vinyl source in 1998, spent two years attempting to find Perhacs before contacting her in 2000, leading to a reissue of Parallelograms on CD and double LP in 2003. The reissue was sourced from tapes in Perhacs' personal collection, vastly improving on the sound quality of the original pressing, and added six bonus tracks of various demos and session outtakes. Sunbeam Records again reissued the album in 2008, adding two bonus tracks, the previously unreleased 1978 song "I Would Rather Love" and an excerpt of a 2005 BBC interview.

Parallelograms was reissued again on vinyl by both Mexican Summer and Sundazed Records in 2010, and by Anthology Recordings in 2014.

In popular culture
The song "Hey, Who Really Cares" was written as the theme song for the short-lived 1970 ABC drama Matt Lincoln, starring Vince Edwards, which ran for a half-season. Perhacs co-wrote the song with composer Oliver Nelson, who had been making music for numerous television shows at the time. The song was recorded for the show by the band God's Children, a short-lived collaboration between Ray Jimenez and Willie Garcia, previously both members of Thee Midniters, and released by Uni Records as a single under the title "Hey, Does Somebody Care." "Hey, Who Really Cares" was covered by R&B group the Whispers on its 1971 debut album, The Whispers' Love Story, and that version was later sampled by US hip hop artist the Notorious B.I.G. in his song "Niggas Bleed", released on his posthumous 1997 album Life After Death. The Perhacs recording was itself sampled by UK hip hop artist Lowkey in his song "Who Really Cares", which appeared on his 2009 compilation album Uncensored.

The song "If You Were My Man" was featured in the 2007 film Daft Punk's Electroma.

The song "Chimacum Rain" was sampled by Prefuse 73 on the track "Rain Edit (Interlude)" from the 2005 album Surrounded by Silence, and by Jadakiss on his song "Rain", released on his 2015 Top 5 Dead or Alive album. A line from the song "Chimacum Rain" was included in the comedy-drama Gilmore Girls season 5 episode "A Messenger, Nothing More."

Track listing
All tracks composed and written by Linda Perhacs, except where noted.
"Chimacum Rain" – 3:33
"Paper Mountain Man" – 3:13
"Dolphin" – 2:56
"Call of the River" – 3:51
"Sandy Toes" – 3:00
"Parallelograms" – 4:36
"Hey, Who Really Cares?" (Perhacs, Oliver Nelson) – 2:44
"Moons and Cattails" – 4:09
"Morning Colors" – 4:48
"Porcelain Baked Cast Iron Wedding" – 4:01
"Delicious" – 4:08Bonus tracks (reissue):
"If You Were My Man" (Demo) – 3:30
"If You Were My Man" (Studio) – 2:59
"Hey, Who Really Cares?" (With Intro) – 3:01
"Chimacum Rain" (Demo) – 3:45
"Spoken Intro to Leonard Rosenman" – 2:19
"Chimacum Rain" (Demo With Sounds) – 4:13

2008 Sunbeam Records reissue only:
"BBC Interview" – 5:52
"I Would Rather Love" – 3:06

Personnel
 Linda Perhacs – vocals, guitar, electronic effects, arranger
 Leonard Rosenman – electronic effects, arranger, producer
 Steve Cohn – lead guitar (6-string, 12-string, electric), arranger
 John Neufield – flute, saxophone
 Milt Holland, Shelley Manne – percussion
 Reinie Press – electric bass, Fender guitar
 "Tommy" – harmonica
 Brian Ingoldsby – amplified shower hose for horn effects (01)
 "Fleetfoot" of Laurel Canyon – guitar (19)

Notes

References

1970 debut albums
Kapp Records albums
Linda Perhacs albums